The following page lists some power stations in Panama.

Hydroelectric

Thermal

See also 
 List of largest power stations in the world

External links

References

Panama
 
Power stations